Paula cautiva is a 1963 Argentine film directed by Fernando Ayala. It won the Silver Condor Award for Best Film.

Cast

External links
 

1963 films
1960s Spanish-language films
Argentine black-and-white films
Argentine drama films
Films directed by Fernando Ayala
1960s Argentine films